The Passaic Red Devils (also known as the Reds) were an American basketball team based in the Bronx, New York that was a member of the American Basketball League.

The team was previously known as the Trenton Bengals.

Year-by-year

Basketball teams in New York City
Sports in the Bronx